Alvise Michiel was an Italian clergyman and bishop for the Roman Catholic Archdiocese of Split-Makarska. He was appointed bishop in 1566. He died in 1582.

References 

1582 deaths
Italian Roman Catholic bishops
Bishops of Split